Sjock festival is a music festival in Belgium since . The festival draws a European crowd featuring Punk rock, Rockabilly, Garage rock and Surf music . The festival takes place every year in Gierle in the first or second weekend of July.

Bands that have featured at Sjock include: Monster Magnet, Dr. Feelgood, The Godfathers, The Fuzztones, The Adolescents, Radiohead, Mudhoney, The Sonics and Dinosaur Jr.

History
1976 (Sunday, 22 August): Risk – Korla Plankton – Treezeke – Piet Van Noppenen – Sandle Wood – Riverboat Shuffle – Schralen Tjip & Mussenschrik – Oregon Size
1977 (end August): Tails Blues – Mustang – Desperated Compagnie- Topas – Cassiopeai – The Count Bishops – Herman Brood
1978 (20 August): Hassle – Hubble Bubble – The Misters – Stage Beast – Herman Brood and His Wild Romance – The Kids – The Count Bishops
1979 (12 August): Treezeke – Scooter – De Kommeniste – Bintangs – De Kreuners – Wilko johnson
1980 (end August): Kazan – 'T He Gene Noam – The Parking Meters – Weekend – The Machines – The Kids – The Pebbles
1981 (end August): The Crew – The Boxcars – The Panamas – Toy – The Meteors – The String – De Kreuners
1982 (end August): The Gigolo's – The Chrome – Ex Hole – Jo lemaire – Scooter – TC Matic
1983 (end August): Blanc de Blanc – Schmutz – 2 Belgen – Seven Roots -Lawi Ebbel – The Scabs – Allez Allez
1984 (end August): Ottomotto – Chow-Chow – Schmutz – Mighty4 & Rebels – Nacht und nebel – Arbeid Adelt! – The Bollock Brothers
1985 (18 August): Bra – French Painter Dead – Seven Roots – Arbeid Adelt! – Luc van Acker – TC Matic
1986 (end August): Slight Return – The Establishments – La Muerte – The Skyblasters – The Masai – Dirk Blanchart – Dr Feelgood
1987 (16 August): Red Scarf – The Nights – De Kreuners – Big Boatsia – L.S.D.-Band – Dr. Feelgood – Disneyland after Dark
1988 (21 August): Venus Juices – Coyote & The Lost Dakota's – Blue Blot – Tröckener Kecks – The Godfathers – The Scabs – The Troggs
1989 (20 August): The Ratmen – The Wolf Banes – The Scene – The Nomads – Washington Dead Cats – Wreckless Eric & Band – The Fuzztones
1990 (19 August): The Sands – The Mudgang – De Kreuners – Plan De Man – Fatal Flowers – The Chills – Raymond van het Groenewoud
1991 (18 August): Cornerstone – The Candy Men – The Paranoiacs – Jack Of Hearts – Jason Rawhead – Claw Boys Claw – Tröckener Kecks
1992 (23 August): Thermos – Spo-dee-o-dee – Hallo Venray – Gruppo Sportivo – De Raggende Manne – Monster Magnet – The Selecter
1993 (22 August): Days Of Adversity – Ashbury Faith – The Romans – Tom Robinson – UK Subs – Radiohead – Aztec Camera
1994 (10 July): Spo-Dee-O-Dee – Terrorvision – Swervedriver (replaced 'The God Machine') – Wizards of Ooze – 35007 – Deviate – Stuffed Babies on Wheels
1995 (9 July): Feedback – Sin Alley – Batmobile – The Del Valentinos – Dildo Warheads – Such A Surge – Dub War – Zion Train – The Source Experience ft. Robert Leiner
1996 (13 July til 14 July): Funeral Dress – Sheffield Wednesday – NRA – Skippies – GBH (replaced 'The Exploited') – Honky – Credit To The Nation – Propellerheads – Starfisch Pool
1997 (11 July til 13 July): No Fun At All – 59 Times The Pain – The Romans – Benjamin B. – Undeclinable Ambuscade – Orange Black – Backfire – Hard Resistance – Victims of Society – Zion Train
1998 (10 July til 12 July): Snuff – Snapcase – Right Direction – Liberator – Undeclinable Ambuscade – 'T Hof Van Commerce – Homethrust – Concrete Cell – No Complacence
1999 (9 July til 11 July): The Toasters – André Williams é the Countdowns – Satanic Surfers – Discipline – The Seatsniffers – Sint Andries MC's – Concrete Cell – Convict – Jennifer Sucks
2000 (7 July til 9 July): Cunzi – Green Lizard – I Against I – Stigmata – U.S. Bombs – Gluecifer – Shelter – The Internationals – The O' Hara's – Fifty Foot Combo – The Seatsniffers – The Whodads
2001 (6 July til 8 July)Intensified – Nashville Pussy – The Forgotten – Peter pan Speedrock – Dead Moon – The Hotknives – Sixer – Smooth Lee – Magnum 500 – The Revelaires – Thee Andrews Surfers – The Highlighters – Mr Atom & his Protons – The Famous Fantastix – Senser – DJ Aphrodite – Millennium Kru – DJ Buzz
2002 (9 July til 11 July): The Stitch – The Ewings – Cowboys & Aliens – Peter pan Speedrock – Action In DC (vervanger Orange Goblin) – Bronco Billy – Los Putas – The Heartaches – Blood or Whiskey – Gasolheads – U.S. Bombs – Down by Law – The Bellrays – New Bomb Turks – The Moe Green Specials – The Highlighters – Fifty Foot Combo – The Arousers – DJ Carl – Hetten Des – Speedball JR – Los Banditos – The Seatsniffers – Big John Bates & the Voodoo Dollz
2003 (12 July til 14 July): The Revolvers – Convict – NRA – The Atomic Bitchwax – Nashville Pussy – No Comply – Funeral Dress – Groovie Ghoulies – Nerf Herder – Triggerfinger – The Cherry Valence – Roger Miret & the Disasters – Nine Pound Hammer – The Mudmen – The Starlite Wranglers – Speedball JR – The Phantom Rockers – The Bamboo Apple Cutters – The Famous Fantastix – The Chrome Daddies – Reef Rider – Number Nine – Hot Boogie Chillun
2004 (9 July til 11 July): The Flaming Sideburns – Street Dogs – Electric Eel Shock – The Bones – The Heartaches – The Nomads – Zeke – Dozer – Fifty Foot Combo – Speedealer – Raging Slab – El Guapo Stuntteam – The Killbots – Mean Devils – The O' Haras – Hubcap – Melltown – Jack Baymoore & The bandits – Boppin Steve & the Playtones – Hetten Des – Slipmates – Kaiser Bill's Batmen – The Baboons
2005 (8 July til 10 July): Bad Preachers – Black Rodeo – Roddy Radiation & the Skabilly Rebels – The Priscillas – White Cowbell Oklahoma – Sweet Poison – ADD – Hetten Des – The Gecko Brothers – The Dell Valentinos – Judasville – Cosmic Psychos – Nashville Pussy – The Rhumba Kings – Runnin' Wild – Sebi Lee – The Million Dollar Sunrise – The Seatsniffers – The Ghosttones – Miss Mary Ann & the Ragtime Wranglers – The Phantom Four – The Round Up Boys – The Houserockers – Smokestack Lightnin' – Big Sandy & his Fly-Rite Boys
2006 (7 July til 9 July): Peter Pan Speedrock – The Real Mckenzies – The Toasters – Boozed – The Last Vegas – The BossHoss – The Kings Of Nuthin' – Tokyo Sex destruction – Lords Of Altamont – Bob Log III – Dunlop Devils (winner of the Sjock Sjowcase) – Captain Murphy – Interfear – Rayburn Anthony – 49 Special – 45 RPM – Catslappin' Chrissy – The Stacy Cats – Moonshine Reunion – The Buckshots – the Taildraggers – Velvetone – Wailin' Elroys – Paul Ansel's Nummer Nine
2007 (6 July til 8 July): The Kids – Triggerfinger – The Bones – Tokyo Dragons – Dirty Fuzz – Mudhoney – Nine Pound Hammer – Nebula – Rawönes – El Guapo Stuntteam – Mother Superior – Ray Collins Hot Club – The Mad men – The Baboons – Big Bayou Bandits – Al & The Black Cats – Los Fabulous Frankies – Spoo-Dee-O-Dee – Miss Ruby Ann – The Nu Niles – Truly Lover Trio ft Dawn Shipley – lawen Stark & The Slideboppers
2008 (11 July til 13 July): The Sonics – The Monsters – The Andrews Surfers Royale – Reverend Beat-Man – The Black Box Revelation (vervanger DKT/MC5) – The Bellrays – The Dwarves – The real McKenzies – The Turbo AC's – Le Chat Noir – Wanda Jackson & The Seatnsiffers – The Big Four – The Hillbilly Boogiemen – Randy Rich & The Poor Boys – The Slipmates – Smokestack Lightnin' – Miss Ruby Ann & the Roundup Boys – Cherry casino & The Gamblers – The Dunlop Devils – Charlie Roy and his Black Mountain Boys
2009 (10 July til 12 July): Batmobile – Mad Sin – The Grave Brothers – Supersuckers – Mike Sanchez – Southern Culture On The Skids – The Jim Jones Revue – Eddie Spaghetti – The Starliters – Reno Divorce – Carlos and the Bandidos – Smooth and the Bully Boys – Paceshifters – Turbonegro – Deke Dickerson & the Eccofonics – New Bomb Turks – James Intveld – Untamed Youth – The Gories – The Oblivians – Domestic Bumblebees – Boppin Steve – Harmonica Sam – The Spades – The Bellhops – Casablanca Carambol Company
2010 (9 July til 11 July): The Swampy's – Frenzy- The Meteors – The Grit – Johnny Trouble & The Rambling Men – Knucklebone Oscar – The Barbwires – The Legendary Shack Shakers – Sue Moreno & the Antwerp Allstars – Peter Pan Speedrock – Luis And The Wildfires – Reverend Horton Heat – Big sandy and his Fly Rite Boys – The Darnell Woodies – The Paranoiacs – The ragtime Wranglers – The A-Bones – Moonshine Reunion – Pat Todd & the Rankoutsiders – The Seatsniffers -The Jim Jones Revue – The dragtones – The Fleshtones – The Paladins – Rocketroom Rhythm & Blues revival featuring Howlin Pelle
2011 (8 July til 10 July): Danko Jones – Nashville Pussy – Guana Batz – Legendary Shack Shakers – The BossHoss – Miss Mary Ann and The Ragtime Wranglers – Guitar Wolf – Spellbound – The Jim Jones Revue – US Bombs – The Sore Losers – Kieron McDonald Combo – JD Mc Pherson – Moonlight Trio – Reno Divorce – Mischief! – Carl and The Rhythm All Stars – Kitty in a Casket – The Mahones – .357 String Band – Rudy La Crioux and The Allstars – Union Avenue – The Adolescents – The Caezars – Voodoo Swing – Suzette and The Neon Angels – The Cheaterslicks – Marc and The Wild-ones – The Four Slicks – Cellophane Suckers – Cave On Fire
2012 (6 July til 8 July): Hank 3 – The Nomads – Bob Wayne and the Outlaw Carnies – The John Spencer Blues Explosion – The Fuzztones – The Blasters – Gizelle – The Bellfuries – The Rob Ryan Roadshow – The Urban Voodoo Machine – Fifty Foot Combo – The Spivs – Moonshine Reunion – The Dirt Daubers – Voodoo Swing – Demented Are Go – Frantic Flintstones – Cenobites – Hipbone Slim And The Kneetremblers – The Lonesome Drifters – Thee Vicars – Hetten Des – The Bad Backbones – Knocksville – Kneejerk Reactions – Jizzlobbers – The Dirty Denims – Kings of Outer Space – The Sonic Beat Explosion – Rebel Yell
2013 (5 July til 7 July): Dinosaur Jr. – Los Straitjackets – Deke Dickerson and the Ecco-Fonics – Black Lips – Paul Ansells Number Nine – The Jim Jones Revue – Wildfire Willie and the Ramblers – Rival Sons – Lang Tall Texans – New Bomb Turks – Throw Rag – The Caravans – The John Lewis Trio – The Baboons – Swinging Utters – The Experimental Tropic Blues Band – Jack Rabbit Slim – Sean and Zander – Bloodlights – Smokestack Lightning – John Coffey – The Rumblejetts – The Ladykillers – Crystal and Runnin' wild – Black Up – The Hi Stars – The Snookys – Adios Pantalones – The Lucky Devils
2014 (11 July til 13 July): The Jon Spencer Blues Explosion – The Paladins – The Sonics – The Bronx – Nekromantix – Los Fabulous Frankies – Bob Wayne – Cosmic Psychos – Peter Pan Speedrock – The Spunyboys – Psycho 44 – Daddy Long Legs – Restless – Slim Cessna's Auto Club – 56 Killers – King Salami and the Cumberland 3 – Big Sandy and his Fly-Rite Boys – The Reverend Peyton's Big Damn Band – Carolina & Her Rhythm Rockets – Lords of Altamont – Raketkanon – Koffin Kats – Marc & The Wild Ones – The Generators – The Delta Bombers – King Hiss – Nico Duportal & his rhythm dudes – Voodoo Swing – The Montesas – Astro Zombies – Boogie Beasts – The Horny Horses – Poncharello
2015 (10 July til 12 July): The Hives – Imelda May – Reverend Horton Heat – Backyard Babies – Southern Culture on the Skids – Heavy Trash – La Muerte – The Sweden Special feat. Domestic Bumblebees and Harmonica Sam – Fifty Foot Combo – Batmobile – The Fleshtones – Lisa and the Lips – Pat Capocci – The Sharks – Bloodshot Bill – The Rhythm Shakers – The Space Cadets – Black Mambas – Jake Calypso and his Red Hot – Walter Broes and the Mercenaries – The Country Side of Harmonica Sam – John Coffey – The Bloodhounds – The Deaf – Jay Malano and the Rhythm Dudes – Annita and the Starbombers – The Barnstompers – The Tinstars feat. Ruby Pearl – OFF! – Powersolo – The Cheaterslicks – Cuda – The Big Time Bossmen – The Backseat Boppers – The Vibromatics – Destroy-Oh-Boy – Id!ots – Hometown Gamblers – The Grave Brothers – We're Wolves
2016 (8 July til 10 July): Flogging Molly – The Mavericks – Danko Jones – Sturgill Simpson – Pokey LaFarge – Radio Birdman – The Nomads – The Bronx – The Devil Makes Three – The Bellfuries – Supersuckers – Turbo AC's – The Polecats – The Hillbilly Moon Explosion – Flat Duo Jets – Kid Congo and the Pink Monkey Birds – Roy Thompson and the Mellow Kings – Darrel Higham and the Enforcers – Miss Lily Moe – Peter Pan Speedrock – Equal Ediots – Smokestack Lightnin' – The Rob Ryan Roadshow – Drugstore Cowboys – Mike Bell and the Belltones – The Offenders – Mischief! – Big Time Bossmen – Los Blancos – The Agitators – The Kieron McDonald Combo – The Baboons – Fuzzy Vox – The Buckshots – Rollmops – Alabasterds – The Devilles – The Fuckin Godoys – Fields of Troy – The Father, the son and the holy Simon – Aloha Sluts

References

External links
 Official site Sjock Festival

Music festivals in Belgium
Lille, Belgium
Summer events in Belgium